Basinan (also Romanized as Basīnān; also known as Sī Nān) is a village in Karchambu-e Shomali Rural District, in the Central District of Buin va Miandasht County, Isfahan Province, Iran. At the 2006 census, its population was 119, in 33 families.

References 

Populated places in Buin va Miandasht County